Shakira Martin (June 1, 1986 – August 3, 2016) was a Jamaican model and beauty pageant titleholder who was crowned Miss Jamaica Universe 2011 and represented Jamaica at Miss Universe 2011 in Brazil on September 12, 2011.

Early life and career
Martin was born on June 1, 1986, in Brooklyn, New York. Her family relocated to South Florida in 1989, but would visit her mother's homeland of Jamaica frequently. She was a student of Nova High School and graduated in 2004. She then attended Broward College. Before becoming a model, Martin was a pre-school teacher.
Martin competed in a pageant in Miami and came in second. A friend of Martin's convinced her to compete in Miss Jamaica Universe. Martin won the title of Miss Jamaica Universe in 2011 and used her crown as a platform to raise awareness for people affected by sickle cell anemia. in 2011, Martin was a part of a toy drive that donated 400 toys to ill children in a Jamaican hospital. She had modeled in countries such as Jamaica, Brazil, Canada and Haiti.

Martin was diagnosed with sickle cell anemia at 3 months old. Both of Martin's parents had the trait for the disease and thus had a 25 percent chance of giving it to a child. Her brother is also a carrier of the trait.

Death
According to Martin's mother, Martin wasn't feeling well after a trip to Jamaica. She died at 12:28 a.m. from complications with sickle cell blood clots in both her lungs. She was 30 years old.

References

External links 
Martin's Official Facebook page
Martin's Instagram
Official Miss Universe Jamaica website (archived)

Jamaican female models
1986 births
2016 deaths
Broward College alumni
Nova High School alumni
Miss Universe 2011 contestants
People with sickle-cell disease
Jamaican people of American descent
Deaths from sickle-cell disease